Zoe Palmer (1903–1983) was a British stage and film actress.

Selected filmography
 Walls of Prejudice (1920)
 The Black Tulip (1921)
 The Other Person (1921)
 Was She Guilty? (1922)
 The Luck of the Navy (1927)
 Sweeney Todd (1928)
 Double Dealing (1932)
 Above Rubies (1932)
 The Blarney Stone (1933)

References

Bibliography
 Goble, Alan. The Complete Index to Literary Sources in Film. Walter de Gruyter, 1999.

External links

1903 births
1983 deaths
British stage actresses
British film actresses
People from Fulham
Actresses from London